State Highway 236 (SH 236) is a state highway in Coryell County, Texas.

Route description
The southern terminus of SH 236 is at  SH 36 and  FM 1114 at The Grove, near the Bell County line. The highway travels to the north and briefly turns to the east before resuming a more northward trajectory as it crosses the Leon River. The route passes to the east of Mother Neff State Park, and access to the park is provided via  PR 14. The SH 236 designation ends at  FM 107 near the McLennan County line; the roadway continues to the north as  FM 2671.

History
SH 236 was originally designated on September 21, 1936 from The Grove to Moody. The segment between its current northern terminus and Moody was transferred to FM 1742 on November 21, 1951, and then to FM 107 on February 20, 1952.

Major intersections

References

225
Transportation in Coryell County, Texas